Lulzim Basha (born 12 June 1974) is an Albanian politician who is serving as the chairman of the Democratic Party of Albania, the main opposition party, from September 2013. 
Basha was elected as chairman of the Democratic Party of Albania in September 2013 following the Democratic Party's electoral loss which sent them in the opposition. In 2021, he became the first opposition leader in Albanian history to lose two general elections in a row, although Basha claimed the losses came as a result of significant electoral interference by the ruling Socialist Party.

With over 8 years at the helm of the Democratic Party of Albania, Lulzim Basha is the second longest serving chairman of the party after Sali Berisha, who was in charge for a total of 16 years.

Early life and education
Lulzim Basha was born in Tirana on 12 June 1974 to a Kosovo-Albanian mother and an Albanian father. From his mother's side, he is respectively from Mitrovica (grandfather) and Gjilan (grandmother). After attending the Sami Frashëri High School, he studied law at Utrecht University in the Netherlands and worked for the International Criminal Tribunal for the former Yugoslavia as member of the investigation team of war crimes of Serbian forces in Kosovo (1998–1999).

In 2000, Basha joined the Department of Justice of the UN administration of Kosovo, UNMIK, first as legal advisor and then as Deputy Chief of Cabinet of the Director of the UNMIK Justice Department since October 2001. From November 2002 until January 2005 Basha served as special advisor for Transition in the same department.

Lulzim Basha is married to Aurela Basha a Dutch citizen, and they have two daughters, Victoria and Dafina.

Political career
Basha joined the Democratic Party of Albania in January 2005 and became a member of the party's leadership in May of that year. He has since held several ministerial positions in Democratic Party-led governments.

Berisha Cabinet (2005–2011)

He served as the party's spokesperson during the 2005 parliamentary elections at which he was elected as the MP of Constituency #33 in Tirana. He was then nominated in the Berisha government as Minister of Public Works, Transport and Telecommunications, where he served for a period of two years.

After the 2009 election, Basha was nominated as Ministry of Internal Affairs in the new Berisha government. As Minister of Interior, he implemented all the required criteria for visa-free travel to the Schengen countries, including the modernisation of the Albanian border and immigration police system, the issuing of high security biometric passports and a tougher fight against criminal activity and criminal assets. These steps won international praise, notably by EUROPOL and other law enforcement bodies, and led to the decision of the EU on 8 November 2010 to lift all travel visa requirements for Albanian citizens effective 15 December 2010.

Mayor of Tirana (2011–2015)
In 2011 Basha was the governing party's candidate for the post of Mayor of Tirana. He defeated the leader of the Socialist opposition, Edi Rama, by a very narrow margin (only 81 votes after the recount) in a hotly contested election.

During his term as mayor, Basha vowed to lead big reforms in his first hundred days in office, while promising to make the municipality more accessible to citizens and free of political conflicts.

His main focus was the development of the new strategic urban plan, to increase investments and employment and solve the traffic problems in the city centre.

A draft was presented in May 2012 and it was considered as very important for the future economic development of the city. It was one of the first successes of Basha as Mayor of Tirana, but the plan was opposed by the opposition.
The new Urban Development Plan proposed a number of measures, primarily with a focus on the road network and, to a smaller degree, on sustainable modes of transport.
A tramway system in addition to the bus system was proposed and the plan also included the building of a new Boulevard in the northern part of the city and the rehabilitation of the Lanë.

The earlier plan for the Skanderbeg Square was scrapped and a new one introduced. The use of the square by all motor vehicles will be restored through the construction of a narrower road segment around the center of the square including bicycle lanes. The existing green field south of Skanderbeg's statue was extended northward for a few hundred meters, while trees were planted in most places.

In May 2013 the City Hall launched an international tender for the construction of the capital's new northern boulevard, with a length of 1.8 km. The project was expected to be finished before Basha's first mandate as mayor, but after the 2013 parliamentary election, the new Rama Government cut off most of the funds.

Basha didn't run for a 2nd mandate in the 2015 local elections, which were won by the Socialist Party candidate Erion Veliaj.

Leader of the opposition (2013–2022) 
After the defeat of the Democratic Party-led coalition in the 2013 parliamentary election and the resignation of Sali Berisha as party leader, Basha was elected as chairman of the Democratic Party on 23 July 2013, following the first one-member-one-vote election in party's history.

On 30 September 2014, a national congress of the Democratic Party was held to elect a new leadership. In the congress a tough reform of the party was announced by Basha. 

During his leadership numerous anti-government demonstrations have been held, accusing the government as corrupt and criminalised. On 2015 the Democratic Party proposed a Decriminalisation Law, which led to several months of negotiations with the government. Finally in December 2015, the law was passed by majority in the Parliament, barring people with criminal convictions from holding public office.

On 11 December 2016 during the celebrations for the 26th anniversary of the Democratic Party, party leader Lulzim Basha announced his program for the further modernization and democratisation of the party ahead of the 2017 parliamentary elections.

After previously promising that 35% of the parliamentary candidates would consist of members from the youth movement of the Party, Basha now announced a limitations of all mandates of the party leaders to a two-year term, and the full democratisation of the internal election process.

On 18 February 2017 members of the Democratic Party and other opposition parties, under the leadership of Lulzim Basha pitched a giant tent outside the Prime Minister's office in Tirana after thousands of protesters rallied to demand free elections and a technocrat government. The opposition protest further escalated into a larger political conflict. The Democratic Party and its allies refused to register to take part in the 18 June general election, until the government will accept their conditions to secure a free and democratic election.

Political positions

EU Integration

Basha is a strong supporter of Albania joining the EU.

Economy
During the 2017 Albanian parliamentary election he proposed reinstating the flat tax at a 9% rate. The flat tax was a form of taxation which had been applied by Berisha's government between 2005 and 2013.

Foreign Affairs
In June 2017, Basha met with President Donald Trump during a visit to the US as part of participation in White House Workforce Development week.

References

External links 

 

|-

|-

|-

|-

1974 births
21st-century Albanian politicians
Albanian diplomats
Leaders of the Democratic Party of Albania
Political party leaders of Albania
Government ministers of Albania
Foreign ministers of Albania
Transport ministers of Albania
Kosovo Albanians
Living people
Mayors of Tirana
Members of the Parliament of Albania